is a former Japanese cyclist. He competed in the men's tandem at the 1964 Summer Olympics. He was a professional keirin cyclist from 1965 to 1999, with 9 championships and 240 wins in his career.

References

1942 births
Living people
Japanese male cyclists
Olympic cyclists of Japan
Cyclists at the 1964 Summer Olympics
Place of birth missing (living people)
Keirin cyclists